Anka Pelova (born 27 January 1939) is a Bulgarian sports shooter. She competed in the mixed 50 metre rifle, prone event at the 1976 Summer Olympics.

References

1939 births
Living people
Bulgarian female sport shooters
Olympic shooters of Bulgaria
Shooters at the 1976 Summer Olympics
Place of birth missing (living people)
20th-century Bulgarian women